Ilybius quadriguttatus is a species of beetle native to Europe and Near East. In Europe, it is found in Austria, Belarus, Belgium, Bulgaria, Croatia, the Czech Republic, mainland Denmark, Estonia, Finland, mainland France, Germany, Great Britain including the Isle of Man, Hungary, mainland Italy, Kaliningrad, Latvia, Liechtenstein, Lithuania, mainland Norway, Poland, Romania, Russia, Slovakia, Slovenia, mainland Spain, Sweden, Switzerland, the Netherlands, Ukraine and Yugoslavia.

References

quadriguttatus
Beetles described in 1835